Jan Redman (21 February 1932 – 1977) was an Australian fencer. She competed in the women's individual and team foil events at the 1964 Summer Olympics.

References

1932 births
1977 deaths
Australian female foil fencers
Olympic fencers of Australia
Fencers at the 1964 Summer Olympics